Vigier is a surname. Notable people with the surname include:

J. P. Vigier (born 1976), Canadian ice hockey player
Jean-Pierre Vigier (born 1969), French politician
Jean-Pierre Vigier (1920–2004), French physicist
Jean Touzet du Vigier (1888–1980), French army officer
Kenny Vigier (born 1979), French footballer
Philippe Vigier (born 1958), French politician

See also
Vigier Guitars, French guitar manufacturer
Vigier Surfreter, electric guitar
Prix Vicomtesse Vigier, French horse race

French-language surnames
Surnames of French origin